The bridled mabuya or bridled skink (Heremites vittatus) is a species of skinks found in North Africa and Middle East. The length of those skinks is up to 22 cm.

The binomial name of this species has seen multiple updates in early 2000. The current binomial name is Heremites vittatus. Previously it was known as Mabuya vittata and for short period as Eutropis vittata and Trachylepis vittata . The reason for those changes is an attempt to divide the vast genus Mabuya in a few smaller genera.

The bridled mabuya lives in open sandy or stony soil with little grass or bushy vegetation.  It is usually found near water; in Egypt in the Wetlands and near oases in Tunisia.  It can grow up to 22 centimeters long and has a smooth, shiny, body with overlapping scales.  Their heads are cone shaped and they have elongated bodies and a tapering tail that is easily broken but can be regenerated.

The bridled mabuya feeds primarily on insects and other arthropods.

References

 The Reptile Database
 ZipcodeZoo
 Freebase
 Skinks

Heremites
Reptiles described in 1804
Fauna of Lebanon
Taxa named by Guillaume-Antoine Olivier